In computing, page zooming is the ability to zoom in and out a document or image at page level. It is usually found in applications related to document layout and publishing, e.g. word processing and spreadsheet programs, but it can also be found in web browsers as it improves accessibility for people with visual impairment and people using mobile devices, such as PDAs and mobiles which have a relatively small screen.

Different modes

There are two notably different modes of page zooming:
 text resizing that resizes the text by increasing or decreasing the font size, with wrapping to avoid horizontal scrolling, leaving the size of the images the same.
 real page zooming mode that resizes also images, other multimedia objects, and viewports.
When zooming in, a horizontal scroll bar will appear when the screen is not wide enough to hold the page content.

Early web browsers had only the ability to resize the text on a page, but in the meantime all major browsers have the ability to resize the full content. The quality differs between the web browsers since they use different algorithms.

Some web browsers now have Zoom Text Only, for text resizing. It should alter all sizes given in em, ex, rem and ch, whatever they may refer to. If the page is carefully written, that can make the main text more readable without sending so much of the less important material outside the window.

This concept has also been extended to home entertainment devices. Most media players of recent generations such as DVD and Blu-ray include (via buttons on a remote) the ability to "zoom" in and out, and to change the focus of the zoom in any direction in two dimensions.

References

See also
 Resolution independence, in which elements on a computer screen are rendered at sizes independent from the pixel grid
 Zooming user interface

User interface techniques